Robert Alexander Wood (born January 12, 1991), nicknamed "A-Wood", is an American professional baseball pitcher for the San Francisco Giants of Major League Baseball (MLB). He has played for the Atlanta Braves, Los Angeles Dodgers, and Cincinnati Reds.

Before playing professional baseball, Wood played for his high school team at Ardrey Kell High School, and college baseball for the Georgia Bulldogs. He underwent Tommy John surgery in 2009.  The Braves selected Wood in the second round of the 2012 MLB draft. He made his MLB debut during the 2013 season for the Braves, and was an All-Star with the Dodgers in 2017. He won the 2020 World Series with the Dodgers.

Early life
Wood was born in Charlotte, North Carolina. He attended Ardrey Kell High School, where he played for the school's baseball team. In 2009 he was named the North Carolina Class 4A player of the year.

He enrolled at the University of Georgia, where he played college baseball for the Georgia Bulldogs baseball team. Wood was redshirted during his first season at Georgia because he had required Tommy John surgery after his senior year of high school. At Georgia, Wood had a 13–10 win–loss record and a 3.57 ERA in 32 games pitched. He struck out 180 batters and walked 47 in  innings.

Professional career

Atlanta Braves (2012–15)

The Atlanta Braves drafted Wood in the second round of the 2012 Major League Baseball draft, and he signed for a signing bonus of $700,000. He played for the Rome Braves of the Class A South Atlantic League in 2012, where he pitched in 13 games, going 4–3 with a 2.22 earned run average (ERA) and 52 strikeouts. 

He began the 2013 season with the Mississippi Braves of the Class AA Southern League. With Mississippi, he was 4-2 with a 1.26 ERA in 57 innings, and with Gwinett, he was 1-0 with a 1.80 ERA in five innings. He was named an MiLB.com 2013 Organization All Star.

After pitching in ten games the first two months of the season and posting an ERA of 1.26, the Braves promoted him to the major leagues on May 30. That night, in his major league debut, he pitched the ninth inning against the Toronto Blue Jays. Wood made his first major league start on June 18, 2013, where he allowed one run and earned his first loss.

Wood finished the 2014 season with an 11–11 record and a 2.78 ERA in 171.2 innings with 170 strikeouts.

Beginning 2015 with Atlanta, Wood was 7–6 with a 3.54 ERA. In 20 starts, he pitched 119.1 innings.

Los Angeles Dodgers (2015–18)
On July 30, 2015, in a three-team trade, the Los Angeles Dodgers acquired Wood, Mat Latos, Michael Morse, Bronson Arroyo, Jim Johnson, Luis Avilán, and José Peraza, while the Miami Marlins acquired minor league pitchers Victor Araujo, Jeff Brigham, and Kevin Guzman, and the Braves received Héctor Olivera, Paco Rodriguez, minor league pitcher Zachary Bird and a competitive balance draft pick for the 2016 MLB Draft. He joined the Dodgers starting rotation and was 5–6 with a 4.35 ERA in 12 starts for them.

Wood began 2016 in the Dodgers starting rotation. He made 10 starts in April and May and was 1–4 with a 3.99 ERA. On May 21 against the San Diego Padres he struck out a career high 13 batters in only six innings of work, the first Dodgers pitcher in history to have struck out that many in so few innings. However, he reported that he was not feeling 100% after a May 30 outing against the Chicago Cubs. An MRI exam the next day revealed a posterior impingement in his left elbow, requiring four weeks of rest, and he was placed on the disabled list. On June 16, he reported that the infringement subsided after he had some fluid drained from his elbow and he would be cleared to resume a throwing program a few days earlier than expected. He threw a simulated game against minor league hitters on July 16 and early reports were that it went well. However, shortly afterwards it was determined that he would need elbow debridement surgery, which would cause him to miss an additional two months. He did not rejoin the Dodgers roster until September 20. Overall, he appeared in 14 games for the Dodgers in 2016 (10 starts) and was 1–4 with a 3.73 ERA. The Dodgers did not carry Wood on their roster for the first round of the playoffs, but on October 15, he was added to their roster for the league championship series. He pitched two scoreless innings in that series. After the season, Wood signed a $2.8 million contract with the Dodgers for 2017, avoiding salary arbitration.

After beginning the 2017 season in the bullpen, Wood moved to the rotation after an injury to Rich Hill. He won the  National League Player of the Week Award for the week of May 8–14 after he pitched 11 scoreless innings with 21 strikeouts over two starts that week. A few weeks later he was also awarded with the  National League Pitcher of the Month Award after he went 5–0 with a 1.27 ERA and 41 strikeouts in May. Wood eventually had his scoreless innings streak snapped at 28 on June 10. On July 5, Wood became the first Dodgers starting pitcher to begin the season 10–0 since Don Newcombe in 1955. On July 7, Wood was named to the 2017 Major League Baseball All-Star Game. 

In 27 appearances for the Dodgers (25 starts and two early season relief appearances) in 2017 he was 16–3 with a 2.72 ERA and struck out 151 batters. He induced a 34.6% chase rate from batters that put him in the top 4% in the category in MLB.  He allowed three runs in 4 innings in his one start in the 2017 NLCS but in the 2017 World Series he started game four and allowed only one run in 5 innings and then came back and pitched two shutout innings of relief in game seven.

In the off-season, Wood signed a one-year, $6 million contract, avoiding salary arbitration. In 2018, he went 9–7 in 33 appearances (27 starts) with a 3.63 ERA.

Cincinnati Reds (2019)
On December 21, 2018, the Dodgers traded Wood to the Cincinnati Reds, along with Matt Kemp, Yasiel Puig, Kyle Farmer, and cash considerations in exchange for Homer Bailey, Jeter Downs, and Josiah Gray. Wood came down with a back injury in spring training, and missed most of the season on the disabled list. He made seven starts and was 1–3 with a 5.80 ERA.

Return to the Dodgers (2020)
On January 12, 2020, Wood returned to the Dodgers on a one-year, $4 million deal. The Dodgers' 2020 season did not begin until late July as a result of the COVID-19 pandemic, and Wood made the start on July 25 against the San Francisco Giants. He struggled with his command in the outing, only lasting three innings, and was placed on the injured list after the game with left shoulder inflammation. He rejoined the active roster on September 1, though he was reduced to a bullpen role for the rest of the season.

Wood appeared in nine games (two starts) on the season, allowing nine earned runs in 12 innings for a career-worst 6.39 ERA, and a career-worst WHIP of 1.816, as he struck out 15 batters. he was left off the roster for the first two rounds of the playoffs but was added back to it for the NLCS, and he pitched  scoreless innings in the series. In the 2020 World Series against the Tampa Bay Rays, Wood appeared in two games, pitching four scoreless innings, as the Dodgers won the championship.

San Francisco Giants (2021–present)
On January 14, 2021, Wood signed a one-year, $3 million deal with the San Francisco Giants.

In the 2021 regular season, Wood was 10–4 with a 3.83 ERA. In 26 starts he pitched 138.2 innings in which he struck out 152 batters, averaging 9.9 strikeouts per 9 innings, and was 4th in the NL in hit batters (16).

On December 1, 2021, Wood re-signed with the Giants on a two-year, $25 million contract.

On June 23, 2022, Wood threw his 1,000th career strikeout against Travis d'Arnaud of the Atlanta Braves. In 2022, he was 8-12 with a 5.10 ERA in 26 starts, and pitched 130.2 innings in which he struck out 131 batters and hit 12 batters (8th in the NL).

Pitching style
Wood pitches with a herky-jerky three-quarters delivery. Based on his previous success, Wood began regularly pitching from the stretch position starting in 2018.  He throws a four-seam fastball , a two-seam sinker 91 to 95 mph (146 to 153 km/h), a changeup , and a knuckle curve .

Personal life
Wood married his longtime girlfriend, Suzanna Villarreal, a Realtor, on November 25, 2017, in Atlanta, Georgia. They reside in Atlanta.

See also
 List of baseball players who underwent Tommy John surgery
 List of World Series starting pitchers

References

External links

1991 births
Living people
National League All-Stars
Baseball players from Charlotte, North Carolina
Major League Baseball pitchers
Atlanta Braves players
Los Angeles Dodgers players
Cincinnati Reds players
San Francisco Giants players
Georgia Bulldogs baseball players
Rome Braves players
Mississippi Braves players
Gwinnett Braves players
Chattanooga Lookouts players
Louisville Bats players